Li Jiqian (963–1004), occasionally also known by his Song-bestowed name of Zhao Baoji (趙保吉), was a Tangut leader and progenitor of China's Western Xia dynasty. He resisted the Song dynasty and organized a rebellion in 984. He also created a successful alliance with the Liao dynasty for military support. Li Jiqian arranged a peace agreement with the Song emperor, but violated the treaty himself. To avoid costly military campaigns, Emperor Zhenzong of Song made Li Jiqian the jiedushi of Dingnan (定難節度使), and recognized Li Jiqian's new autonomous rule. He supported the construction of irrigation canals that were crucial for the development of agriculture in the arid areas of northwestern China, especially around the capital Xingqing (modern Yinchuan).

Li Jiqian was father of Li Deming, and grandfather of Li Yuanhao, the founder of the Western Xia dynasty. He was conferred the temple name "Wuzong" (武宗) and the posthumous name "Emperor Yingyun Fatian Shenzhi Rensheng Zhidao Guangde Guangxiao" (應運法天神智仁聖至道廣德光孝皇帝) by Li Deming in 1005. Later, he was honored with the temple name "Taizu" (太祖) and the posthumous name "Emperor Shenwu" (神武皇帝) by Li Yuanhao.

In 1644, Li Zicheng, founder of the short-lived Shun dynasty, accorded the temple name "Taizu" (太祖) to Li Jiqian because Li Zicheng grew up in a village in Shaanxi called "Li Jiqian's walled village" (李繼遷寨), and he therefore claimed ancestry from him.

Family 
Consorts and issue:

 Empress Shuncheng Yixiao, of the Yeli clan (順成懿孝皇后野利氏, d.1007)
 Li Deming
 Yelü Ting, Princess Yicheng of Khitan (義成公主耶律汀)

References

External links
www.chinaknowledge.de

963 births
1004 deaths
Song dynasty jiedushi
10th-century Tangut rulers
Liao dynasty jiedushi
People from Northwest China
11th-century Tangut rulers